Gerald "Jerry" Masucci (October 7, 1934 – December 21, 1997) was an American attorney, businessman and was co-founder of Fania Records.

Biography
Masucci was born in Brooklyn, New York to Italian immigrant parents Urbano and Elvira Masucci. He was a police officer in New York City before attending, and during law school. In 1960, he graduated from New York Law School as a juris doctor. He then worked for a public relations firm in Cuba, where he became interested in Latin music.

In 1964 in New York City, Masucci, then a divorce attorney, and Johnny Pacheco, a Dominican musician, established Fania Records. They started out selling records out of the trunk of cars on the streets of Spanish Harlem, signing up young artists, creating new sounds, and eventually having hit records. Over the next 15 years, Fania Records helped define the sound, culture, and language associated with the salsa genre, a musical movement that arose partly from the unavailability in the United States of music produced in Cuba.

In 1980, he was running Fame, a modeling agency.

Masucci died of aortic aneurysm caused by a heart attack in Buenos Aires, Argentina on December 21, 1997 at age 63. It was reported that he had three daughters, Darlene, Misty and Corinne.

Discography

Studio albums
A Tribute to Tito Rodríguez (Fania, 1976)
Latin Connection (Fania, 1981)
Social Change (Fania, 1981)
Guasasa (Fania, 1989)
Ray  Barretto  ACID (Fania 1968)

Live albumsLive at the Red Garter, Vol. 1 (Fania, 1968)Live at the Red Garter, Vol. 2 (Fania, 1969)Live at the Cheetah, Vol. 1 (Fania, 1972)Live at the Cheetah, Vol. 2 (Fania, 1972)Live at the Cheetah, Vol. 2 (Fania, 1973)Latin-Soul-Rock (Fania, 1974)Fania All-Stars (Island, 1975)Live in Japan 76 (Fania, 1976)Live at Yankee Stadium, Vol. 1 (Fania, 1976)Live at Yankee Stadium, Vol. 2 (Fania, 1976)Live (Fania, 1978) Habana Jam (Fania, 1979) Live in Africa (Fania, 1986)

DVDsOur Latin Thing (Fania 1972)Salsa (Fania, 1974)In Africa (Fania, 1993)Live'' (Fania, 1995)

References

1934 births
1997 deaths
New York Law School alumni
People from Brooklyn
Fania Records artists
Record producers from New York (state)
Music promoters
New York (state) lawyers
American people of Italian descent
20th-century American businesspeople
New York City Police Department officers
20th-century American lawyers